Brain-fficial is a South Korean web television program on the History Korea channel, hosted by Kim Jong-min. Every week, a different guest appears, to have a one-on-one debate with Kim Jong-min on various topics. The show has aired on the channel's official YouTube, Naver and Facebook channels, starting from July 19, 2018.

On November 5, 2018, Brain-fficial opened its new channel and new episodes will be releasing starting from November 15, 2018 after the last episode that was released previously on September 20, 2018.

On Season 2, the title of the show was changed from My Brain-fficial to Brain-fficial.

Starting from December 26, 2018, Brain-fficial will air on every Wednesday instead of every Thursday at 5pm KST.

Episodes

Season 1

Season 2

Notes 

This is a special episode. Rather than the usual way where there is a fixed topic for every episode, for this episode, they will randomly choose three out of a number of colored balls and debate about the topic written on the slip of paper within.

This is another special episode where there's no fixed topic, but rather, they collected the viewers' topics and discuss 3 of them.

This is a special episode which is released on Sunday rather than the usual Wednesday in collaboration with My Little Old Boy.

This is a special episode which features Jong-min completing his 100 thousand subscribers pledge by singing 'Our Dream' (One Piece OST Part 1 Korean Version) which was sung originally by Koyote.

During this week, the edited version of Brain-fficial's 1st live YouTube video was released instead of the usual debating episode.

For this week, the edited version of Brain-fficial × KYT 20th Anniversary Fan Meeting live YouTube video was released instead of the usual debating episode.

 This is a special episode to celebrate Brain-fficial YouTube channel's 1st Anniversary.

Awards and Norminations

References

External links 
 Official Website
 Official YouTube Channel

Korean-language television shows
2018 South Korean television series debuts
Debate television series